Simon Connelly Booth (born 5 October 1956) is an Australian former professional rugby league footballer who played for Manly Warringah and Balmain in the NSWRL competition.

Recruited from Lakes United in Newcastle, Booth was a centre and winger during his career. 

Booth featured in Manly's 1978 premiership team, playing on the wing in both the grand final draw and replay win over Cronulla.

In 1983 and 1984 he played for Balmain, under his former Manly coach Frank Stanton.

References

External links
Simon Booth at Rugby League project

1956 births
Living people
Australian rugby league players
Manly Warringah Sea Eagles players
Balmain Tigers players
Rugby league centres
Rugby league wingers
Lakes United Seagulls players
Rugby league players from New South Wales